A folly tower is a tower that has been built as an architectural folly, that is, constructed for ornamental rather than practical reasons.
Folly towers are common in Britain and Ireland, and often do have some practical value as landmarks, or as viewpoints, unlike other types of folly.

List of folly towers

Notes

References
 
 The Follies Journal (published annually). The Folly Fellowship. 
 Follies (magazine, published thrice yearly). The Folly Fellowship. .
 </ref>

External links
 Follies of Europe 
 Folly Fellowship